The 1941–42 Palestine League was the ninth season of league football in the British Mandate for Palestine. The defending champions were Hapoel Tel Aviv.

The Palestine League was divided into three regional divisions (Haifa, Jerusalem, Southern) with playoffs at the end of the season, with the league winners and the Southern League runners-up qualifying for a championship playoff.

The Haifa League was cancelled on 5 March 1942  and a cup competition was played instead. Homenetmen Jerusalem won the Jerusalem League, and Maccabi Rishon LeZion won the Southern League. This meant that the two league winners, along with runner-up Maccabi Tel Aviv qualified to the championship playoff.

The championship playoff was won by Maccabi Tel Aviv.

Southern League

Jerusalem League
Homenetmen Jerusalem won the Jerusalem League. R.A.M.C. Jerusalem and Elitzur Jerusalem withdrew from the league.

Championship play-off
At the conclusion of the regional leagues a championship play-off was held, with the two league winners and Maccabi Tel Aviv, runner-up of the Southern League. The matches between Maccabi Tel Aviv and Maccabi Rishon LeZion were held first, with Maccabi Tel Aviv winning the matches 2–0 and 5–0. Next, Maccabi Rishon LeZion and Homenetmen Jerusalem drew their match 3–3, but later Homenetmen chose to forfeit their matches against Maccabi Tel Aviv, after which Homenetmen were ejected from the play-offs and Maccabi Tel Aviv was declared winner.

Table

References
RSSSF
Previous seasons The Israel Football Association 

Palestine League seasons
Palestine
1941–42 in Mandatory Palestine football